Pedro Álvarez de Toledo y Zúñiga (13 July 1484 – 21 February 1553) was a Spanish politician. The first effective Spanish viceroy of Naples, in 1532–1552,  he was responsible for considerable social, economic and urban improval in the city and southern Italian kingdom in general. He was the father-in-law of Cosimo I de' Medici, Grand Duke of Tuscany.

Biography

Early life
He was born in 1484 near Salamanca in Spain, the second son of Fadrique Álvarez de Toledo, 2nd Duke of Alba. His paternal grandmother was Maria Enríquez, the half-sister of Juana Enríquez, Queen Consort of Aragon through her marriage to widower king of Aragon Juan II of Aragon, and the mother of Ferdinand II of Aragon and ancestress of Habsburgs. Through this relation, Charles V, Holy Roman Emperor and King of Spain was a second cousin of Don Pedro.

Viceroy of Naples
Spain took over the Kingdom of Naples in 1503 and solidified her grasp after the final, failed attempt by France in 1529 to retake the kingdom. For the first three decades of the century, a succession of inconsequential viceroys ruled the vicerealm. Don Pedro arrived as viceroy in September 1532.

Don Pedro’s rebuilding of the city went on for years. Old city walls were expanded and an entirely new wall was built along the sea front. Fortresses along those walls and further up and down the coast from the city were modernized, and the Arsenale—the naval shipyards—were expanded considerably. Don Pedro also built the viceregal palace as well as a dozen blocks of barracks nearby, a square grid of streets lined with multi-storied buildings—unique in Europe for its time. Today, that section of Naples is still called the “Spanish Quarter”. The goal was to make not just the city of Naples, but the Gulf of Naples and eventually, the entire vice-realm invulnerable—that is, the entire southern Italian peninsula.

Don Pedro ruled harshly. In 1542 he closed the Accademia Pontaniana. He instituted summary execution for petty theft on public streets and made it a capital crime to go armed at night in the city. He was ruthless in dealing with feudal barons in the countryside and encouraged their moving into the city within reach of a central authority. This breaking-up of land holdings began a trend to urbanization as both the landed class and the landless peasant class poured into Naples. By 1550, the population of 200,000 was second only to Paris in all of Europe. Within the city, he centralized administration, moving all courts onto the same premises, the Castel Capuano, also known as the "Vicaria".

Don Pedro is remembered as the viceroy who tried without success to institute the Spanish Inquisition in Naples, in 1547. When the announcement of the Inquisition finally came in May 1547, the protest was immediate, turning violent very quickly. It was not a "popular" revolution, but rather a revolt by many of the landed nobility in and around Naples and Salerno, property owners who knew that the Inquisition had a reputation for confiscating the wealth and property of those whom it questioned. Additionally his Jewish chief financier Samuel Abravanel along with his wife Benvenida, may have had some influence on him, in regards to ending his aspirations of an Inquisition.

Don Pedro, upon the order of the emperor Charles V, backed down and the Inquisition was called off. In 1552, Charles V calmed the populace further by sending Toledo off to Siena to handle a local problem. The viceroy died in Florence, where one of his daughters, Eleanor of Toledo was duchess  consort of Medici the following year.

Don Pedro's reputation as a city-builder has stood the test of time. The city of Naples still bears his stamp in countless places. He was supposed to be entombed in the church of San Giacomo degli Spagnoli in Naples, but his sudden death in Florence meant he was buried in the Cathedral of Florence then.

Family

Ancestry

Descendants
Don Pedro Álvarez de Toledo married in 1508 Maria Osorio Pimentel, 2nd Marchioness of Villafranca del Bierzo. They had seven children:

 Eleanor of Toledo, married  in 1539 Cosimo I de' Medici, Grand Duke of Tuscany. With issue.
 Fadrique Álvarez de Toledo y Osorio, 3rd Marquess of Villafranca del Bierzo; (1510 - 1569). 3rd Marquess on the death of his mother in 1539. He married Inés Pimentel, but no issue.
 García Álvarez de Toledo, 4th Marquess of Villafranca, a.k.a. García Álvarez de Toledo y Osorio (1514–1577, in Naples, Italy) became the 4th Marquess of Villafranca del Bierzo in 1569, when his brother Fadrique died without issue, albeit being married. He  married Vittoria Colonna, having issue, Pedro, who survived till 1627.
 Ana de Toledo, married Lopo de Moscoso Osório, 4th count of Altamira.
 Juana Álvarez de Toledo, married Fernando Ximenez de Urrea, 2nd Count of Aranda
 Isabel de Toledo, married Gian Battista Spinelli, 2nd Prince of Cariati
 Luis Álvarez de Toledo y Osorio, interim Viceroy of Naples for 2 months in 1552, commander in the Order of Santiago.

References

Citations

Other sources

1484 births
1553 deaths
People from the Province of Salamanca
Viceroys of Naples
Pedro Alvarez de Toledo, 2nd Marquis of Villafranca
Knights of Santiago
Marquesses of Spain
16th-century Neapolitan people